{
  "type": "FeatureCollection",
  "features": [
    {
      "type": "Feature",
      "properties": {},
      "geometry": {
        "type": "Point",
        "coordinates": [
          9.158057212043788,
          45.48146824664756
        ]
      }
    }
  ]
}The Rhinos Milano are an American football team based in Milan, Italy.  The team was founded in 1976 (first team in Italy) and won the Italian  championship in 1981, 1982, 1983, 1990 and 2016. The Rhinos play in the Italian Football League (formerly called Series A) the highest level league in Italy.

History 
The team was founded as Pantere Rosa di Piacenza. In 1978 the Rhinos were part of the first game played between two Italian teams where they defeated the Busto Arsizio Frogs.

The 2016 season saw the Rhinos Milano, with Head Coach Chris Ault, winning all of their 13 games played to complete a perfect season.

Seasons 
1978 	June 25 Rhinos Milano-Frogs Busto Arsizio 34–0 First American Football game between two Italian teams
1979–80 	First team able to play at the Nato bases' tournament
1981 	Serie A Italian Champions (vs Frogs Gallarate 24–8)
1982 	Serie A Italian Champions (vs Frogs Gallarate 11–0)
1983 	Serie A Italian Champions (vs Warriors Bologna 20–14)
1984 	Serie A 4° place Division North
1985 	Serie A 3° place Division East Quarter finals (@ Panthers Parma 14–24)Under 20 Italian Champions
1986 	Serie A 2° place Division West Semifinals (@ Angels Pesaro 0–10)
1987 	Serie A 2° place Division B Quarter finals (@ Seamen Milano 7–29)
1988 	Serie A 1° place Division Center Semifinals (vs Warriors Bologna 13–20)
1989 	Serie A 4° place Division A Quarter finals (@ Chiefs Ravenna 13–14)
1990 	Serie A Italian Champions (vs Frogs Legnano 33–6)
1991-93 	didn't play any game
1995 	Serie A 3° place Division B Quarter finals (@ Phoenix Bologna 14–32)
1996 	Serie A 5° place Division A
1997 	Serie A 3° place Division West Wild Card (@ Bergamo Lions 13–21)
1998 	Serie A 3° place Division B
1999-2001      didn't play any game
2002 	Serie C (Fivemen) 5° place
2003 	Serie C - NWC 1° place NWC BOWL Champions (vs Chargers Novi Ligure 35–12)
2004 	Serie C - NWC 1° place Girone A made the NWC BOWL (vs Red Jackets Sarzana 7–22)
2005 	Serie B - 4° place Division North Quarter finals (@ Guelfi Firenze 0–25)
2006   Serie A2 - 2° place Division NorthWestern (5° place Sauceda National Ranking) Semifinals (@ Hogs Reggio Emilia 0-42)
2007   Serie A1 - 6° place (record 2–6)
2008   IFL (Italian Football League) - 5° place (record 4–6)
2009   IFL (Italian Football League) - 5° place (record 4–5)
2010   IFL (Italian Football League) - 6° place (record 4–4)
2011   IFL (Italian Football League) - 4° place (record 5–4)
2012   IFL (Italian Football League) - 5° place (record 8–3)
2013   IFL (Italian Football League) - 7° place (record 2–6)
2014   IFL (Italian Football League) - 7° place (record 5–5)
2015   IFL (Italian Football League) - 7° place (record 5–5)
2016   IFL (Italian Football League) - 1° place (record 13–0) Italian Champions (vs Giants Bolzano 44–18)
2018   IFL (Italian Football League) - 6° place (record 4–6)
2019   II Division - 1st place (record 8-0)

Roster 2020

Coaching Staff 2022

References

External links
Rhinos.it Official Milano Rhinos website

American football teams in Italy
Sport in Milan
American football teams established in 1976
1976 establishments in Italy